Pharmacy of Love is the eighth studio album by Dutch indie rock band Bettie Serveert. It was released on March 23, 2010 on Second Motion Records.

Critical reception

Several critics gave Pharmacy of Love mixed reviews and/or described it as a return to Bettie Serveert's musical roots.

Track listing
	"Deny All" – 3:02
	"Semaphore" – 3:32
	"Love Lee" – 3:40
	"Mossie" – 3:12
	"The Pharmacy" – 3:49
	"Souls Travel" – 2:47
	"Calling" – 9:32
	"Change4me" – 4:10
	"What They Call Love" (Loud Version) – 4:13

Personnel
Carol Van Dyk – vocals/guitar
Peter Visser – guitar
Herman Bunskoeke – bass
Joppe Molenaar – drums

References

Bettie Serveert albums
2010 albums
Second Motion Records albums